Jamall Walker (born August 7, 1977) is an American basketball coach who is an assistant coach at Grand Canyon University.

Early life
A native of Wichita, Kansas, Walker graduated from Wichita South High School. As a high school senior in 1995, Walker was named Kansas Gatorade Player of the Year.

College career
After graduating from high school Walker played for head coach Charlie Spoonhour at Saint Louis and started 73 games for the Billikens. Alongside future NBA lottery pick Larry Hughes, Walker helped the Billikens reach the second round of the 1998 NCAA Division I men's basketball tournament before losing to eventual national champions Kentucky Wildcats. Instead of attempting a professional basketball career overseas, Walker decided to go into coaching after his collegiate career.

Coaching career
Walker's coaching career began as a varsity assistant at Alton High School in the Metro East area of Illinois during the 2000 season before serving in the same position at F. L. Schlagle High School in Kansas City, Kansas from 2001-02. From 2003–2004 Walker spent two seasons as an assistant coach at Redlands Community College in El Reno, Oklahoma. During his two seasons, Redlands went 67-5 and was the 2004 National Junior College Athletic Association (NJCAA) Division I national runner-up. Walker later moved to work as an assistant coach at Ball State under Tim Buckley for two seasons. Over the next  four seasons from 2007—2010 Walker spent a single season with the following programs: Saint Louis under Brad Soderberg, Murray State under Billy Kennedy, Ohio under John Groce, and with Arizona as the director of basketball operations under Sean Miller. After a season with Arizona, Walker returned to Ohio for two more seasons with John Groce. In 2012, Walker became an assistant at Illinois following Groce, who was hired as Illinois' head coach. Walker was named interim head coach after Groce was fired March 11, 2017, and Walker lead the Illini to a 2-1 record in the 2017 National Invitation Tournament. After Illinois hired head coach Brad Underwood, Walker was retained as an assistant coach.

Head coaching record

†Walker was interim head coach for Illinois during 2017 NIT

References

External links
Illinois Profile
Arizona Profile
Player Statistics
Coaching Statistics

1977 births
Living people
American men's basketball coaches
American men's basketball players
Arizona Wildcats men's basketball coaches
Ball State Cardinals men's basketball coaches
Basketball coaches from Kansas
Basketball players from Wichita, Kansas
High school basketball coaches in the United States
Illinois Fighting Illini men's basketball coaches
Junior college men's basketball coaches in the United States
Murray State Racers men's basketball coaches
Ohio Bobcats men's basketball coaches
Point guards
Saint Louis Billikens men's basketball coaches
Saint Louis Billikens men's basketball players